The men's 100 metres event at the 2007 Asian Athletics Championships was held in Amman, Jordan on July 25–26.

Medalists

Results

Heats

Semifinals
Wind: Heat 1: +1.5 m/s, Heat 2: +4.2 m/s

Final
Wind: +0.9 m/s

References
Heats results
Semifinals & Final results

2007 Asian Athletics Championships
100 metres at the Asian Athletics Championships